Mary Pat Wilson (born 12 September 1963) is a Puerto Rican alpine skier. She competed in two events at the 1988 Winter Olympics.

References

1963 births
Living people
Puerto Rican female alpine skiers
Olympic alpine skiers of Puerto Rico
Alpine skiers at the 1988 Winter Olympics
People from Middleburg, Virginia